Fanny Wilson (25 May 1874–11 September 1958) was a notable New Zealand army nurse and matron. She was born in Christchurch, North Canterbury, New Zealand in 1874.

During World War 1 she was in the New Zealand Army Nursing Service (NZANS). In 1916 she became Acting Matron at the NZANS convalescent camp at Hornchurch in Essex.

References

1874 births
1958 deaths
New Zealand nurses
New Zealand military personnel
People from Christchurch
New Zealand women nurses